Pediomelum castoreum is a species of flowering plant in the legume family known by the common names beaver Indian breadroot and beaver dam breadroot. It is native to the deserts around the intersection of California, Nevada, and Arizona, where it grows in local habitat including disturbed areas. It is a perennial herb with no stem or a short stem that is mostly underground, leaving the plant at ground level. The compound leaves are each made up of five or six oval leaflets which may be over 4 centimeters long. The leaf is borne on a long petiole. The inflorescence is a raceme of several blue or purple pealike flowers each roughly a centimeter long. The fruit is a hairy oval legume pod tipped with a long, curved beak. It contains ridged gray seeds each about 6 millimeters long.

External links
Jepson Manual Treatment
USDA Plants Profile
Photo gallery

Psoraleeae
Flora of Arizona
Flora of California
Flora of Nevada
Flora without expected TNC conservation status